The M17 motorway is an inter-urban motorway in Ireland, forming part of the Sligo to Galway national primary road.

Route
The motorway runs between the Kilmore Roundabout in Tuam and Junction 18 on the M6 motorway. There is one Junction (19) which is an exit for Roscommon and Baile Chláir.

Junctions

History

A number of upgrade projects were planned for the N17, which forms part of the Atlantic Corridor under Transport 21, along with the N18 and N20. Prior to the 2017 upgrade, the Southern Section N17 was the state's busiest single-carriageway inter-urban road with over 25,000 vehicles using the road at Claregalway daily of which over 20,000 travel on the Claregalway-Galway section south of Claregalway.

In April 2014, this project was given the go-ahead by the Government and was opened to the public by Minister Shane Ross on the 27th of September 2017, many months ahead of schedule.

The motorway is not tolled.

References

Motorways in the Republic of Ireland
Roads in County Galway